Władysław is a Polish given male name, cognate with Vladislav. The feminine form is Władysława, archaic forms are Włodzisław (male) and Włodzisława (female), and Wladislaw is a variation. These names may refer to:

Famous people

Mononym
Włodzisław, Duke of Lendians (10th century)
Władysław I Herman (ca. 1044–1102), Duke of Poland
Władysław II the Exile (1105–1159), High Duke of Poland and Duke of Silesia
Władysław III Spindleshanks (1161/67–1231), Duke of Poland
Władysław Opolski (1225/1227-1281/1282), Polish duke
Władysław of Salzburg (1237–1270), Polish Roman Catholic archbishop
Władysław I the Elbow-high (1261–1333), King of Poland
Władysław of Oświęcim (c. 1275–1324), Duke of Oświęcim
Władysław of Bytom (c. 1277–c. 1352), Polish noble
Władysław of Legnica (1296–after 1352), Duke of Legnica
Władysław the Hunchback (c. 1303-c. 1352), Polish prince
Władysław the White (c. 1327–1388), Duke of Gniewkowo
Władysław II of Opole ( – 1401), Polish duke
Władysław II Jagiełło (1351–1434), Grand Duke of Lithuania and King of Poland
Władysław I of Płock (c. 1406-1455), Polish noble
Władysław of Głogów (c. 1420–1460), Silesian nobleman
Władysław III of Poland (1424–1444), King of Poland, and King of Hungary
Władysław of Zator (1455–1494), Duke of Zator
Władysław IV Vasa (1595–1648), King of the Polish-Lithuanian Commonwealth

Given name
Władysław
Władysław Anders (1892–1970), Polish general and politician
Władysław Bartoszewski (1922–2015), Polish politician and activist
Władysław Bortnowski (1891–1966), Polish historian and general
Władysław Gomułka (1905–1982), Polish politician
Władysław Hańcza (1905–1977), Polish actor and theatre director
Władysław Hasior (1928–1999), Polish sculptor and painter
Władysław Filipkowski (1892–1950), Polish general
Władysław Franciszek Jabłonowski (1769–1802), Polish and French general
Władysław Kowalski (disambiguation), several people
Władysława Majerczyk (born 1952), Polish cross-country skier
Władysław Malecki (1836–1900), Polish painter
Władysław Marcinkowski (1858–1947), Polish sculptor
Władysław Raczkiewicz (1885–1947), President of Poland from 1939 to 1947
Władysław Raginis (1908–1939), Polish military commander
Władysław Reymont (1867–1925), Polish novelist and 1924 laureate of the Nobel Prize in Literature
Władysław Sikorski (1881–1943), Polish military and political leader
Władysław Ślewiński (1854–1918), Polish painter
Władysław Strzemiński (1893–1952), Polish painter
Władysław Szpilman (1911–2000), Polish pianist and composer
Wladislaw Taczanowski (1825–1893), German politician
Władysław Żeleński (disambiguation), several people

Władysława
 Władysława Habicht (1867–1963), Polish activist
 Władysława Majerczyk (born 1952), Polish cross-country skier
 Władysława Markiewiczówna (1900–1982), Polish pianist and educator

Surname
 Blanka Wladislaw, Brazilian chemist

Places
 Władysław, Lesser Poland Voivodeship
 Włodzisław, Goleniów County
 Włodzisław, Sławno County

See also 
 Ladislav
 Vladislav

Polish masculine given names